The Pioneer Log Cabin Museum is a historical log cabin located in Cassopolis, Michigan, built in 1923. It was originally conceived as a temporary structure for the Pioneer Day Picnic by Charles Harmon, then Secretary of the Cass County Pioneer Society. 146 logs of various species were hauled on April 4, 1923, and construction began on May 23. Children were given the day off of school, and the Cassopolis Military band led a parade down South Broadway Street to Stone Lake, where the cabin was to be sited. A crew of forty six built the cabin. Each log had a serial number painted on the end which corresponded to the donor list. The cabin was dedicated on Pioneer Day: June 20, 1923.

Members of the community made furniture and donated relics and memorabilia to furnish the log cabin. Andirons, crane and lug hooks were donated for the fireplace. A museum collection located in the lobby of the court house was moved to the log cabin and incorporated into the display there. The museum opened on June 18, 1924.

The cabin consists of two stories  with a -story wing of the same dimensions. It has a cement floor downstairs. When built, the cabin had a back porch  overlooking Stone Lake.

In June 1924 to pay off the debt for the museum, Charles Harmon arranged to sell "lots" on the cabin grounds for $1.00 each. This is equivalent to $ in present-day terms.

During 1972–1973, a  room was built on the rear of cabin, replacing the porch. The addition was used to provide more display area for the memorabilia and artifacts.

Today, support is provided by donations from visitors, the museum gift shop, the Cassopolis, Michigan Chamber of Commerce and local government.(1)

Notes
(1)The information on this page came from a booklet created by M. L. Gaskin. Sources for this booklet includes newspaper articles and other original documents from the Cass County Historical library and the Cass County Pioneer Log Cabin Museum.

References

External links 
 Official website

Museums in Cass County, Michigan